Andrew Butt is a British former rower.

Career 

Butt competed for Durham University Boat Club as a student. He was part of the British crew that took the silver medal in the lightweight men's eight at the 1992 World Championships in Montreal. He replicated this achievement in the same event three years later, at the 1995 World Championships in Tampere.

Butt works in the insurance industry. He became a Christian in 2003 and is now a church deacon.

References

Living people
English male rowers
Durham University Boat Club rowers
Alumni of Durham University
Year of birth missing (living people)
World Rowing Championships medalists for Great Britain